Qiu Haiyan (born 17 June 1974) was a female Chinese former football midfielder.

She was part of the China women's national football team at the 1999 FIFA Women's World Cup, and at the 2000 Summer Olympics, but did not play.

References

Bibliography

See also
 China at the 2000 Summer Olympics

1974 births
Living people
Chinese women's footballers
Place of birth missing (living people)
Women's association football midfielders
Asian Games medalists in football
Footballers at the 1998 Asian Games
China women's international footballers
1999 FIFA Women's World Cup players
Olympic footballers of China
Footballers at the 2000 Summer Olympics
Asian Games gold medalists for China
Medalists at the 1998 Asian Games